Terry Gray may refer to:

 Terry Gray (footballer) (born 1954), English footballer
 Terry Gray (ice hockey) (born 1938), hockey player
 Terence Gray, Cambridge theatre producer and Taoist writer